Ben Wolfson was an American football coach. He served as the head football coach at Moravian College in Bethlehem, Pennsylvania in 1942 and Lafayette College in Easton, Pennsylvania from 1943 to 1945, compiling a career college football coaching record of 15–12–2.

High school coaching
Wolfson was the head football coach at Catasauqua High School in Northampton, Pennsylvania in 1940.

Moravian College
Wolfson served as the head football coach at Moravian College in Bethlehem, Pennsylvania for one season in 1942.

Lafayette College
When Moravian shut down sports during World War II, Wolfson took the head coaching job at Lafayette College, which he held for three seasons, from 1943 to 1945.

Professional football
Wolfson served as the head coach of the Scranton Miners (1946) and Wilkes–Barre Barons (1947) of the American Football League.

Head coaching record

College

References

Year of birth missing
Year of death missing
East Stroudsburg Warriors football players
Lafayette Leopards football coaches
Moravian Greyhounds football coaches
High school football coaches in Pennsylvania